Ronald Carter Jr. (born August 31, 1956) is a retired American basketball shooting guard. He played college basketball at the Virginia Military Institute.

Early years
Carter attended Perry Traditional Academy. He accepted a basketball scholarship from the Virginia Military Institute. He contributed to the school winning two Southern Conference championships (1975–76 and 1976–77). In the NCAA basketball tournament, he led his team to the Elite Eight (1976) and the Sweet 16 (1977).

As a senior, he set school records with 45 points scored in a single-game (against Long Beach State College), 19 free throws made in a single-game (against Siena College), and an average of 26.3 points per contest during the season. He averaged 19.2 points (third in school history), 6.9 rebounds per game and had sixty 20+ scoring games (school record) during his career.

He was a three-time All-SoCon and All-tournament selection. He was a two-time Southern Conference Player of the Year and the SoCon tournament's Most Outstanding Player (1976). He finished his college career as the tenth-highest scorer in conference history (2,228 points).

Carter was the first athlete in school history to have his jersey retired (#13). In 1989, he was inducted into the VMI Sports Hall of Fame. He was named to the Southern Conference's 75th Anniversary third-team Men's Basketball Team. In 2018, he was inducted into the Southern Conference Hall of Fame.

Professional career
Carter was selected by the Los Angeles Lakers in the 2nd round (26th pick overall) of the 1978 NBA draft, becoming the first Virginia Military Institute player to be drafted and to play in the league. He appeared in 46 games under head coach Jerry West. He averaged 3.1 points per game and was waived on October 4, 1979.

On November 15, 1979, he signed as a free agent with the Indiana Pacers. He played in 13 games and averaged 2.5 points. He was cut on December 5. On February 15, 1980, he was re-signed as a free agent by the Indiana Pacers. He was released on February 25.

On September 15, 1983, he attempted a comeback and signed with the Los Angeles Lakers. He was released on October 24.

Personal life
Carter has 4 children: sons Ronald and Paul, and daughters Bria and Brooke. Ronald III was a 2-time NCAA All-American triple jumper while attended California State University, Long Beach. Paul played collegiate basketball at the University of Illinois at Chicago and played professionally in Europe.

, Ron Carter was the city manager of Benton Harbor, Michigan.

References

External links

1956 births
Living people
African-American basketball players
American men's basketball players
Basketball players from Pittsburgh
Indiana Pacers players
Los Angeles Lakers draft picks
Los Angeles Lakers players
Point guards
Shooting guards
VMI Keydets basketball players
21st-century African-American people
20th-century African-American sportspeople